Margaret Waters, otherwise known as Willis, was an English murderer hanged by executioner William Calcraft on 11 October 1870 at Horsemonger Lane Gaol (also known as Surrey County Gaol) in London.

Waters was born in 1835 and lived in Brixton. She was known for baby farming, the practice of taking in other women's children for money, a practice which often resulted in infanticide.

Waters drugged and starved the infants in her care and is believed to have killed at least 19 children. Charged with five counts of wilful murder as well as neglect and conspiracy, Waters was convicted of murdering an infant named John Walter Cowen.  Her sister, Sarah Ellis, was convicted in the same case for obtaining money under false pretences and sentenced to eighteen months' hard labour.

See also
List of serial killers by country

References

1835 births
1870 deaths
1870 murders in the United Kingdom
1870s murders in London
19th-century executions by England and Wales
Baby farming
English murderers of children
English people convicted of murder
Executed English women
Executed people from London
Infanticide
People convicted of murder by England and Wales
People executed for murder
People from Brixton
Suspected serial killers